Samuel Parry may refer to:

Sam Parry (born 1991), Welsh rugby union player
Samuel Parry, founder of the Western Australian Charity Orchestra